Corynespora is a fungus genus. It is a member of the mitosporic Ascomycota, a heterogeneous group of ascomycotic fungi whose common characteristic is the absence of a sexual state.

Species in the genus induce Corynespora leaf spot in  bleeding hearts (Clerodendrum thomsoniae).

See also 
 List of mitosporic Ascomycota
 List of bleeding heart diseases

External links 
 Index Fungorum
 USDA ARS Fungal Database

References 

 Singh A, Singh SK, Kamal. 2000. Three new species of Corynespora from India. Journal of Mycology and Plant Pathology 30: 44–49.
 Zhang K, Fu H-B, Zhang X-G. 2009. Taxonomic studies of Corynespora from Hainan, China. Mycotaxon 109: 85–93.
 Zhang X-G, Xu J-J. 2005. Taxonomic studies of Corynespora from Guangxi, China. Mycotaxon 92: 431–436.

Pleosporales